The Orchard is an album by singer Lizz Wright that was released in 2008.

Track listing
 "Coming Home"
 "My Heart"
 "I Idolize You" (Ike Turner)
 "Hey Mann"
 "Another Angel"
 "When I Fall"
 "Leave Me Standing Alone"
 "Speak Your Heart"
 "This Is"
 "Song for Mia"
 "Thank You" (Jimmy Page, Robert Plant)
 "Strange" ([Mel Tillis], [Fred Burch])

Personnel
 Lizz Wright – vocals
 Glenn Patscha – keyboards, background vocals
 Patrick Warren – keyboards
 Kenny Banks – piano
 Larry Campbell – pedal steel guitar, mandolin
 Oren Bloedow – acoustic guitar, electric guitar, bass
 Chris Bruce – acoustic guitar, electric guitar, bass
 Joey Burns – acoustic guitar, cello, bass, quarto, baritone guitar
 Toshi Reagon – acoustic guitar, background vocals
 John Convertino – drums, percussion, vibraphone
 Larry Eagle – drums, percussion
 Ben Perowsky – drums
 Josette Newsam – background vocals
 Catherine Russell – background vocals
 Marc Anthony Thompson – background vocals
 The Southside Horns (Jacob Valenzuela & Martin Wenk) – trumpets

References

External links
 Lizz Wright interview by Pete Lewis, 'Blues & Soul' March 2008
 discogs

2008 albums
Lizz Wright albums